Nilam K.C. (Khadka) is a Nepalese politician, belonging to the Communist Party of Nepal (Marxist-Leninist). After the 2008 Constituent Assembly election she became a Constituent Assembly member.

References

Living people
Communist Party of Nepal (Marxist–Leninist) politicians
Place of birth missing (living people)
Year of birth missing (living people)
Members of the 1st Nepalese Constituent Assembly